Lake Peekskill is a hamlet in the town of Putnam Valley in Putnam County, New York, United States, centered on Lake Peekskill. Lake Peekskill has a post office with ZIP code 10537.

References

Hamlets in Putnam County, New York
Hamlets in New York (state)